Satish Chandra Gulabdas is a Fiji Indian businessman and politician, who has been the Mayor of Savusavu and a member of House of Representatives in Fiji.

He was elected unopposed into the House of Representatives in the 1994 general election from the Cakaudrove Indian Communal Constituency on a National Federation Party (NFP) ticket.

He contested the Macuata East Cakaudrove Indian Communal Constituency for the National Federation Party in the 1999 and 2001 general elections but lost on each occasion by a large margin.

References 

National Federation Party politicians
Indian members of the House of Representatives (Fiji)
Fijian Hindus
Living people
Politicians from Savusavu
Year of birth missing (living people)